Nicholas Philpot Leader (1808 – 31 March 1880) was an Irish Conservative politician.

After unsuccessfully contesting the seat at the 1841 general election and a by-election in 1847, he was elected MP for Cork County at a by-election in 1861 and held the seat until 1868.

References

External links
 

1808 births
1880 deaths
Irish Conservative Party MPs
UK MPs 1859–1865
UK MPs 1865–1868
Members of the Parliament of the United Kingdom for County Cork constituencies (1801–1922)